Thomas Basnett (1808–1886) was a prominent British astronomer and meteorologist. He built Marabanong in the Jacksonville, Florida area and married Eliza Wilbur in his third marriage. Basnett moved from England to Illinois in 1835 and ran a drugstore. Circa 1876 he constructed Marabonong on a promontory above the St. Johns River near Jacksonville, Florida

References

19th-century British astronomers
British meteorologists
1886 deaths
1808 births